The Book of Enos is the fourth book of the Book of Mormon. According to the text it was written by Enos, a Nephite prophet.

This short book consists of a single chapter and relates Enos' conversion after praying all day and all night, and his subsequent dialogue with the Lord.  It also discusses the redemption of the Nephites and their enemies, the Lamanites. The narrative of the Book of Enos is often used in the Church of Jesus Christ of Latter-day Saints as an example of faith.

According to the Book of Mormon, Enos was the son of Jacob.  Jacob was the younger brother of Nephi.  Both Nephi and Jacob were sons of Lehi.

Narrative 

One time Enos was hunting in the woods and he remembered the gospel according to his father, and he got on his knees and cried all day and into the night for the salvation of his soul. Then the voice of God told Enos that his sins were forgiven. Enos believed the voice, but he was curious about how the forgiveness was actually accomplished.  God told Enos he was forgiven because he had faith in Christ, even though he never heard or saw Christ, and indeed it would be far in the future before he came in the flesh.

Enos then prayed for the salvation of the Nephites, but God said they would be blessed or cursed according to how they obeyed the commandments. Enos, fearing that the Nephites would refuse to obey the commandments of God, then prayed for the Lamanites who oppressed them, that at least they would avoid destruction. And he prayed that God would preserve a record of the Nephites so that someday the Lamanites too might be brought to salvation, even though anything the Nephites said and did now in Enos' time would have nothing to do with salvation on that future day, but only faith in Christ, whose death and resurrection would be in the past instead of the future. Nevertheless, God made a covenant with Enos that he would bring the records of the Nephites to the Lamanites in due time.

Enos took up the mantle of prophet and went among his people the Nephites lest they be destroyed as God had warned. Enos does not say whether he was successful at converting the Nephites back to the true faith, but he does say the Nephites failed to convert the Lamanites back to the true faith.

He characterized the Lamanites as having a hatred that was fixed. The Lamanites were led by their evil nature to become a wild and bloodthirsty people. They were full of idolatry and filthiness and fed upon beasts of prey.  They dwelt in tents, wandered about in the wilderness, wore a short skin girdle about their loins and their heads were shaven.  Their skill was in the bow, and in the cimeter, and the ax. Many of them ate nothing except raw meat. They were continually seeking to destroy the Nephites who tilled the land, grew fruit in orchards, and tended flocks of cattle and goats and horses.

See also
 Book of Mormon

Notes

External links

 The Book of Enos from the official website of The Church of Jesus Christ of Latter-Day Saints

Enos